Ebenezer Hazard (January 15, 1744 – June 13, 1817) was an American businessman and publisher. He served in a variety of political posts during and after the American Revolutionary War: as Postmaster of New York City; in 1776 as surveyor general of the Continental Post Office; United States Postmaster General where he served from 1782 to 1789.

In 1792 he published the first English translation of A Short Account of the Mohawk Indians, their Country, Language, Figure, Costume, Religion, and Government (1644), compiled from letters written by Dutch minister Johannes Megapolensis to friends about his years of ministry near present-day Albany, New York.

Biography
Hazard was born in Philadelphia and educated at Princeton University. He established a publishing business in New York City in 1770, but quit that business after five years. He was appointed first postmaster of the city under the Continental Congress.

In 1776, he was appointed as surveyor general of the Continental Post Office. He was elected a Fellow of the American Academy of Arts and Sciences in 1781 and was elected a member of the American Philosophical Society that same year.

In 1782 Hazard succeeded Richard Bache as the United States Postmaster General, serving until 1789. (From 1785 to 1790, New York City served as the capital of the United States.) During his tenure as Postmaster General under the new Federal Constitution, Hazard reorganized the Post Office. He established a system to transport mail by stagecoaches on main routes in order to increase capacity, displacing the old horse and rider system.

Hazard did not keep President George Washington's favor, however; because during the Constitutional Convention, he had put a stop to the customary practice by which newspaper publishers were allowed to distribute copies by mail. Washington wrote an indignant letter to John Jay about this action. He said that it was doing "mischief" by "inducing a belief that the suppression of intelligence at that critical juncture was a wicked trick of policy contrived by an aristocratic junto." As soon as Washington could take action, he had Hazard replaced by Samuel Osgood. As a member of the old Congress Osgood had served on a committee to examine the post-office accounts.

After being replaced, Hazard moved back to Philadelphia. He helped to establish the Insurance Company of North America in that city. He worked at this until his death. Long interested in history, in 1792 he printed the first English translation of Johannes Megapolensis' A Short Account of the Mohawk Indians, their Country, Language, Figure, Costume, Religion, and Government, first published in the Netherlands in 1644. It was a record of the Dutch missionary's observations of the Mohawk and their territory west of Albany, New York during the period of Dutch rule. Megapolensis is considered the first Protestant missionary to Native Americans.

Hazard also published at Philadelphia his two-volume Historical Collections; Consisting of State Papers, and Other Authentic Documents; Intended as Materials for an History of the United States of America. The first volume appeared in 1792 and the second in 1794.

Personal life
Hazard married Abigail Arthur in 1783, and they had two children.

He died at his home in Philadelphia on June 13, 1817, and was interred at the Arch Street burying ground. His remains were later relocated to Laurel Hill Cemetery.

References

Further reading
 Shelley, Fred. “Ebenezer Hazard: America's First Historical Editor.” William and Mary Quarterly 12#1 1955, pp. 44–73. online

External resources
The Peter Force Library at the Library of Congress holds important compilations of pamphlets that were assembled by Ebenezer Hazard.

1744 births
1817 deaths
American publishers (people)
Fellows of the American Academy of Arts and Sciences
People of the Province of New York
People of colonial Pennsylvania
Politicians from Philadelphia
Princeton University alumni
United States Postmasters General
American businesspeople in insurance
Postmasters of New York City
Burials at Laurel Hill Cemetery (Philadelphia)